Zhijiang may refer to:

 Zhijiang, Hubei (枝江市), county-level city of Yichang, Hubei, China
 Zhijiang Dong Autonomous County (芷江侗族自治县), Huaihua, Hunan, China
 Zhijiang Town, a town and the county seat of Zhijiang Dong Autonomous County in Hunan